Brøndby IF is a women's football club from Brøndby, Denmark. It is the female team of Brøndby IF.

The team is one of Denmark's best women's teams, having won six championships and 5 cups in the 2000s. The team also reached the semi-finals of the UEFA Women's Cup 2003–04, UEFA Women's Cup 2006-07 and UEFA Women's Cup 2014-15. They are currently coached by Per Nielsen after Peer Lisdorf stepped down.

Honours

Official
National championships (12): 2003, 2004, 2005, 2006, 2007, 2008, 2011, 2012, 2013, 2015, 2017, 2019
National cups (11): 2004, 2005, 2007, 2010, 2011, 2012, 2013, 2014, 2015, 2017, 2018

Invitational
 Turbine Hallencup (1): 2013

UEFA Competitions Record

Current squad
As of 26 February 2022

Transfers

 Joining

 Leaving

Former players
For details of former players, see :Category:Brøndby IF (women) players.

References

External links
 Brondby.com (official website)
  Brondby IF (amateur foundation)
  BrondbySupport.dk (official fanclub)
  90min.dk (Daily news site)
 UEFA profile

Women's football clubs in Denmark
Brøndby IF
1964 establishments in Denmark